There are 14 Minor League Baseball (MiLB) leagues and 206 teams in operation across the United States, Dominican Republic, and Canada, which are affiliated with Major League Baseball (MLB) teams. They are organized by one of five classes (from highest to lowest): Triple-A, Double-A, High-A, Single-A, and Rookie. Of these, 120 teams in 11 leagues (from Triple-A to Single-A) are each affiliated with one MLB team through a standardized professional development license. Additionally, three leagues consisting of a total of 85 Rookie teams are located at MLB spring training complexes in Arizona and Florida, as well as in the Dominican Republic. These affiliated leagues contest their seasons during the MLB season.

The Arizona Fall League, consisting of six teams, operates in the autumn after the conclusion of the MiLB and MLB seasons to develop top prospects at various classifications.

Seven independent baseball leagues, consisting of a total of 69 teams, have no direct affiliation with Major League Baseball, though the American Association, Atlantic League, Frontier League, and Pioneer League are designated MLB Partner Leagues.

Leagues affiliated with Major League Baseball

Triple-A leagues
 

The Triple-A classification is the highest level of play in Minor League Baseball, just below Major League Baseball. A total of 30 affiliated teams compete at this level, with 20 teams in the International League and 10 teams in the Pacific Coast League.

International League

Pacific Coast League

Double-A leagues

The Double-A classification is the second-highest level of play in Minor League Baseball. A total of 30 teams compete at this level, with 12 teams in the Eastern League, 8 teams in the Southern League, and 10 teams in the Texas League.

Eastern League

Southern League

Texas League

High-A leagues

High-A is the third-highest level of play in Minor League Baseball. A total of 30 teams compete at this level, with 12 teams in the Midwest League, 12 teams in the South Atlantic League, and 6 teams in the Northwest League.

Midwest League

South Atlantic League

Northwest League

Single-A leagues

Single-A is the fourth-highest level of play in Minor League Baseball. A total of 30 teams compete at this level, with 12 teams in the Carolina League, 10 teams in the Florida State League, and 8 teams in the California League.

Carolina League

Florida State League

California League

Rookie leagues

The Rookie classification is the lowest level of play in Minor League Baseball. A total of 85 teams compete at this level, with 18 teams in the Arizona Complex League, 20 teams in the Florida Complex League, and 47 teams in the Dominican Summer League.

Arizona Complex League

Florida Complex League

Dominican Summer League

Fall leagues

Arizona Fall League

The Arizona Fall League, an off-season league owned and operated by Major League Baseball, consists of six teams in the state of Arizona.

MLB Partner Leagues
MLB Partner Leagues consist of 45 teams with no direct affiliation with individual MLB organizations, but collaborate on promoting the sport in North America. Three leagues, the American Association, Atlantic League, and Frontier League, had been fully independent leagues, while the Pioneer League had previously been a Rookie-classification affiliated league.

American Association of Professional Baseball

The American Association of Professional Baseball consists of 12 teams.

Atlantic League of Professional Baseball

The Atlantic League of Professional Baseball consists of 10 teams.

Frontier League

The Frontier League consists of 16 teams.

Pioneer League

The Pioneer League consists of 10 teams.

Non-partner independent leagues

Empire Professional Baseball League

The independent Empire Professional Baseball League consists of 5 teams.

Pecos League

The independent Pecos League consists of 16 teams.

United Shore Professional Baseball League

The independent, single-site United Shore Professional Baseball League consists of four teams.

See also

List of developmental and minor sports leagues
List of professional sports leagues#Americas
List of defunct professional sports leagues
Minor League Baseball rosters

References

 
 
leagues and teams
 
Minor League Baseball

zh:美国职棒小联盟